Screen & Radio Weekly was a nationally syndicated Sunday tabloid-newspaper-supplement published by the Detroit Free Press from 1934 to 1940 that covered film, radio, and fashion – and included a short story.

History 
The concept for the publication has been attributed to Dougles DeVeny Martin (1885–1963), one of five 1932 Pulitzer Prize winning journalists from the Detroit Free Press, who, in April 1934, proposed – to Malcolm Wallace Bingay (1884–1953), managing editor – publishing a weekly tabloid supplement in full color, 16 pages covering cinema and radio entertainment "to interest adult-minded readers, with no salacious gossip and a bare minimum of press-agent claptrap. All factual material used, according to promotional material, was staff-written and each issue featured one short story.

The Detroit Free Press first published S&RW April 29, 1934, with a photo of Janet Gaynor on the cover – an era marked by the Great Depression, before television. Full-scale commercial TV broadcasting did not begin in the United States until 1947. Movies and radio, in 1935, according to author Donovan A. Shilling, served as a relief for people living in an era of few jobs.

On the first anniversary of the publication (in 1935), circulation was 1,700,000 – reportedly more than any two other fan magazines combined.

Editors, reporters, and contributors 
A few S&RW columnists who also wrote for the Detroit Free Press used pseudonymous bylines and were identified as Free Press journalists, sans the word "Detroit."

Fashion and beauty
 
 
 
 

Film
 

Hollywood
 
 
 

Managing editors
 
 

Radio
 

Theater

Archival access 
The issues of Screen & Radio Weekly include neither mastheads nor volumes nor issue numbers – only dates. The Margaret Herrick Library – the main repository of print, graphic and research materials of the Academy of Motion Picture Arts and Sciences – holds issues of Screen & Radio Weekly.

Digital archival access 

Newspapers.com
 Atlanta Constitution
 Brooklyn Times-Union
 Dayton Herald Denver News Detroit Free Press Des Moines Register Knickerbocker Press Oakland Tribune Sacramento Union South Bend Tribune Star-Gazette, Elmira, New York
 St. Paul Daily NewsGenealogy.com
 Chicago Daily Times The Daily Telegram, Adrian, Michigan
 Macon Telegraph Miami Herald Milwaukee Journal New Orleans Item Plain Dealer, Cleveland
 Register Star, Rockford, Illinois
 Virginian-PilotOther
 Long Island Sunday Press''

Notes and references

Notes

References 

Celebrity magazines published in the United States
Defunct magazines published in the United States
Detroit Free Press
Entertainment magazines published in the United States
Fashion magazines published in the United States
Film magazines published in the United States
Lifestyle magazines published in the United States
Magazines established in 1934
Magazines disestablished in 1940
Magazines published in Detroit
News magazines published in the United States
Print syndication
Weekly magazines published in the United States